Castañeda or Castaneda is a Spanish surname.

The name's meaning is habitational, from any of various places in Santander, Asturias, and Salamanca, derived from castañeda, a collective of castaña "chestnut".  The name is believed to be created by the fact that the bourgeois House of Castañeda was situated in a valley of chestnuts, thus meaning "Castle of the Chestnuts."

In non-Hispanic countries, the name is usually spelled Castaneda (without the tilde). In Portuguese, this name is spelled Castanheda.

The surname can be found primarily in Spain, Portugal and the Americas after the Spanish conquest of North and South America.

People with the surname
Cacho Castaneda (born 1942 as Humberto Vicente Castagna), Argentine singer and actor
Carlos Castañeda (footballer) (born 1963), former Guatemalan football player
Carlos Castaneda (1925–1998), American author on Mesoamerican shamanism
Carlos Castañeda (historian) (1897–1958), historian
Cristián Castañeda (born 1968), Chilean football player
David Castañeda (born 1989), Mexican-American actor
Germán Villa Castañeda, Mexican football player
Guadalupe Castañeda, retired Mexican footballer
Hector-Neri Castañeda (1924–1991), Guatemalan philosopher and author
Javier Castañeda, former Spanish footballer
Jean Castaneda (born 1957), former French footballer
Jorge Castañeda (disambiguation), multiple people with the name
Jorge Ubico y Castañeda (1878–1946), President of Guatemala 1931–1944
Juan Castañeda (born 1980), Spanish championship fencer
Justiniano Borgoño Castañeda (1836–1921), Peruvian soldier and politician, President of Peru briefly in 1894
Luis Castañeda Lossio, Peruvian politician, mayor of Lima
Luis Orán Castañeda (1979–2020), Colombian road cyclist
Maureen Castaneda, American businesswoman, former officer of Enron Corporation
Movita Castaneda (1916–2015), American actress, second wife of Marlon Brando
Gerardo Castañeda, former Olympic shooter from Guatemala

Spanish-language surnames